Patterns in Jazz is an album by American saxophonist Gil Mellé recorded in 1956 and released on the Blue Note label.

Reception
The Allmusic review by Stephen Thomas Erlewine awarded the album 4½ stars and stated "Gil Melle's debut album for Blue Note, is filled with bright, bold colors and identifiable patterns that camouflage how adventurous the work actually is. On the surface, the music is cool and laid-back, but close listening reveals the invention in Melle's compositions and arrangements of the standards... Ultimately, Patterns in Jazz is cerebral music that swings -- it's entertaining, but stimulating".

Track listing
All compositions by Gil Mellé except where noted
 "The Set Break" - 4:48
 "Weird Valley" - 5:13  	
 "Moonlight in Vermont" (John Blackburn, Karl Suessdorf) - 4:52 	
 "Long Ago (And Far Away)" (Ira Gershwin, Jerome Kern) - 4:32 	
 "The Arab Barber Blues" - 9:05 	
 "Nice Question" - 8:17
Recorded at Rudy Van Gelder Studio, Hackensack, New Jersey on April 1, 1956.

Personnel
Gil Mellé - tenor saxophone, baritone saxophone
Eddie Bert - trombone (tracks 1-4)
Joe Cinderella - guitar
Oscar Pettiford - bass
Ed Thigpen - drums

References

 

Blue Note Records albums
Gil Mellé albums
1956 albums
Albums produced by Alfred Lion
Albums recorded at Van Gelder Studio